Cyrus King (September 6, 1772 – April 25, 1817) was a U.S. Representative from Massachusetts, half-brother of Rufus King.

Early life and education 
Born in Scarborough in Massachusetts Bay's Province of Maine, King attended Phillips Academy, Andover, Massachusetts, and was graduated from Columbia College, New York City, in 1794. He studied law.

Career 
King served as private secretary to Rufus King when he was United States Minister to England in 1796.
He completed law studies in Biddeford and was admitted to the bar in 1797, commencing his law practice in Saco.
He served as major general of the Sixth Division, Massachusetts Militia.
King was one of the founders of Thornton Academy in Saco.

King was elected as a Federalist to the Thirteenth and Fourteenth Congresses (March 4, 1813 – March 3, 1817).

Death 
He returned to Saco (then in Massachusetts' District of Maine), where he died on April 25, 1817 and was interred in Laurel Hill Cemetery.

Sources

External links 

 Finding aid to Cyrus King papers at Columbia University. Rare Book & Manuscript Library.

1772 births
1817 deaths
Members of the United States House of Representatives from the District of Maine
People from Saco, Maine
People from Scarborough, Maine
Columbia College (New York) alumni
American militia generals
Federalist Party members of the United States House of Representatives from Massachusetts